Communist Party of India (Marxist–Leninist) Janashakti, abbreviated CPI (ML) Janashakti, was a communist political party in India. In 2013, CPI (ML) Jansakthi merged into CPIML.

History
CPI (ML) Janashakti was formed in 1992 when six revolutionary communist groups merged. The six groups were: 
Communist Party of India (Marxist–Leninist) Resistance
Communist Party of India (Marxist–Leninist) P.V. Rao (break-away from Communist Party of India (Marxist–Leninist) New Democracy)
Communist Party of India (Marxist–Leninist) Khokan Majumdar
Communist Revolutionary Group for Unity
Coordination Committee of Communist Revolutionaries
A faction of the Unity Centre of Communist Revolutionaries of India (Marxist–Leninist)

CPI (ML) Janashakti is mostly based in the revolutionary tradition of Andhra Pradesh, with the mass line developed by Chandra Pulla Reddy and T. Nagi Reddy, legends of the Telangana Rebellion. The party followed a combination of both armed underground and parliamentary methods of struggle. Initially things went well for the party, and in the 1994 assembly elections of Andhra Pradesh Vidhan Sabha it won a seat. It had launched 13 candidates in all and won the Sirsilla assembly seat in Karimnagar district. N. V. Krishnaiah was the candidate who won the Sirsilla seat.

A trade union, All India Federation of Trade Unions, and a peasants movement were built up.

But the unity did not last for long. In 1996 a group left the party, and they later formed Communist Party of India (Marxist–Leninist) Unity Initiative (today part of Communist Party of India (Marxist–Leninist) (Kanu Sanyal)). A series of splits followed. Towards the end of the 1990s the party reoriented itself towards the underground armed struggle, and pulled out of the open mass work.

Modern
Today the party is primarily concentrated in Andhra Pradesh. The party split into several factions, which work with little or without coordination. The main faction is the group led by Koora Rajanna. COM.Subhash is the Andhra Pradesh state secretary of the party. The All India secretary of the party is COM.Misro 
The party conducts armed struggle through dalams. Police sources has claimed that CPI (ML) Janashakti has 200 to 300 armed cadres.

One break-away group is Communist Party of United States of India (also referred to as the Janashakti Veeranna faction).

Another faction, the South Regional Provincial Committee, merged with Communist Party of India (Marxist–Leninist) (Chandra Pulla Reddy) on 11 April 2004, thus forming the Communist Party of India (Marxist–Leninist) Janashakti (Chandra Pulla Reddy).

Ahead of the 2004 Lok Sabha elections, CPI (ML) Janashakti signed a joint boycott declaration together with the Communist Party of India (Marxist–Leninist) People's War and the MCC(I).

On 23 September 2004, the Andhra Pradesh state government declared they would hold peace talks with CPI (ML) Janashakti and Peoples War Group. These peace talks went in vain when both the government and the revolutionary parties did not hold trust in the other. Later Koora Rajanna was arrested by the police in Uttar Pradesh state of India and was sent to Warangal central jail. Many cases that were booked on Koora Rajanna were cancelled for lack of proper evidences.

In 2007 Virasam AP state secretary was affiliated with CPI (M-L) Janashakti. He was also arrested in July 2009 and Adhikaara Pratinidhi Azaad (Com. Subhash) became AP state secretary. The party had a leading role in the Andhra Pradesh revolutionary movement. AP State Committee of Janasakthi declared that Mr. Koora Rajanna was not a member of CPI(M-L) Janashakti. In April 2011 at Guntur district of AP, 7 members  of CPI (M-L) Janashakti were arrested and 2dbbl guns, one 8mm  rifle, one 9mm pistol, and two tapanchas were lost at this incident.

In June 2011, Party bulletin "Janashakti" (People's Unity) released in Telugu. Today party is organising under the name of CPI (M-L) Janashakti Re-Organising Committee. This group also tries to merge with CPI (M-L) Praja Prathighatana.

In June 2011, majority members of the Andhra Regional Committee of CPI (M-L) Praja Prathighatana, under the presidency of Com. Vijayakumar, joined to CPI (M-L) Janasakthi.

In 2013, CPI (ML) Jansakthi merged into CPIML.

References

External links
Report to the 6th International Conference of Marxist-Leninist Parties & Organizations delivered by CPI (ML) Janashakti

Boycott Call 2004
More on Indo-Pak Conflict, Communist Party of India (Marxist-Leninist) Janashakti

Political parties established in 1992
International Conference of Marxist–Leninist Parties and Organizations (International Newsletter)
Communist militant groups
Janashakti
Left-wing militant groups in India
Maoist organisations in India
Naxalite–Maoist insurgency